Lisa Schindler (born 30 July 1929) is an Austrian sprint canoeist, born in Hamburg, Germany, who competed in the early 1960s. She finished ninth in the K-2 500 m event at the 1960 Summer Olympics in Rome.

References
Lisa Schindler's profile at Sports Reference.com

External links
 

1929 births
Austrian female canoeists
Canoeists at the 1960 Summer Olympics
Olympic canoeists of Austria
Possibly living people
Sportspeople from Hamburg